Blepharepium is a genus of robber flies in the family Asilidae. There are about 15 described species in Blepharepium.

Species
These 15 species belong to the genus Blepharepium:

 Blepharepium auricinctum (Schiner, 1867) c g
 Blepharepium cajennense (Fabricius, 1787) g
 Blepharepium cajennensis (Fabricius, 1787) c g
 Blepharepium coarctatum (Perty, 1833) c g
 Blepharepium cunctabundum Papavero & Bernardi, 1973 c g
 Blepharepium inca Curran, 1942 c g
 Blepharepium luridum Rondani, 1848 c g
 Blepharepium lynchi Carrera, 1949 c g
 Blepharepium maculipennis (Macquart, 1855) c g
 Blepharepium priapus Papavero and Bernardi, 1973 i c g
 Blepharepium secabile (Walker, 1860) i c g
 Blepharepium sonorensis Papavero & Bernardi, 1973 i c g b
 Blepharepium subcontractum (Walker, 1856) c g
 Blepharepium surumu Papavero & Bernardi, 1973 c g
 Blepharepium vorax Curran, 1942 c g

Data sources: i = ITIS, c = Catalogue of Life, g = GBIF, b = Bugguide.net

References

Further reading

External links

 

Asilidae
Articles created by Qbugbot
Asilidae genera
Taxa named by Camillo Rondani